Nicole Strausak (born 21 October 1971) is a Swiss curler who retired from competitive curling in March 2005. Amongst other awards, she received a World Junior Silver medal in 1991, a European Silver medal in 1993 and a World Silver medal in 2000. In 1999, at the European Curling Championships in Chamonix, as well as receiving a Bronze medal, she was awarded the Fair Play & Friendly Award by her fellow athletes for her conduct and attitude, on and off the ice.

She coached the Latvian women's team at the 2013 World Women's Curling Championship.

References

External links
 

1971 births
Living people
Swiss female curlers
Swiss curling coaches